Galectin-9 was first isolated from mouse embryonic kidney in 1997 as a 36 kDa beta-galactoside lectin protein. Human galectin-9 is encoded by the LGALS9 gene.

Function 

The protein has N- and C- terminal carbohydrate-binding domains connected by a link peptide. Multiple alternatively spliced transcript variants have been found for this gene.

Galectin-9 is one of the most studied ligands for HAVCR2 (TIM-3) and is expressed on various tumor cells. However, it can also interact with other proteins (CLEC7A, CD137, CD40). For example, an interaction with CD40 on T-cells induced their proliferation inhibition and cell death.

Galectin-9 also has important cytoplasmic, intracellular functions and controls AMPK in response to lysosomal damage that can occur upon exposure to endogenous and exogenous membrane damaging agents such as crystalline silica, cholesterol crystals, microbial toxins, proteopathic aggregates such as tau fibrils and amyloids, and signaling pathways inducing lysosomal permeabilization such as those initiated by TRAIL. Mild lysosomal damage, such as that caused by the anti-diabetes drug metformin  may  contribute to the therapeutic action of metformin by activating AMPK. The mechanism of how Galectin-9 activates AMPK involves recognition of exposed lysosomal lumenal glycoproteins such as LAMP1, LAMP2, SCRAB2, TMEM192, etc., repulsion of deubiquitinating enzyme  USP9X, increased K63 ubiquitination of TAK1 (MAP3K7) kinase, which in turn phopshorylates AMPK and activates it. This signaling cascade directly links Galectin-9 intracellular function with ubiqutin systems. Galectin-9, through its regulation of AMPK, a kinase that negatively regulates mTOR, cooperates with Galectin-8-based effects to inactivate mTOR downstream of the lysosomal damaging agents and conditions.

Clinical significance 

The expression of galectin-9 has been detected on various hematological malignancies, such as CLL, MDS, Hodgkin and Non-Hodgkin lymphomas, AML or solid tumors, such as lung cancer, breast cancer, and hepatocellular carcinoma.

HAVCR2/ galectin-9 interaction attenuated T-cell expansion and effectors function in tumor microenvironment and chronic infections. Moreover, galectin-9 contributed to tumorigenesis by tumor cell transformation, cell-cycle regulation, angiogenesis, and cell adhesion. The correlative studies analyzing the expression of galectin-9 and malignant clinical features showed controversial results. This can be explained as that galectin-9 can promote tumor immune escape as well as inhibit metastasis by promoting endothelial adhesion. Therefore many factors such as tumor type, stage, and the involvement of different galectins should be take into consideration when correlating the expression level and the malignancy.

Galectin-9, through its cytoplasmic action in control of AMPK, may affect various health conditions impacted by AMPK, including metabolism, obesity, diabetes, cancer, immune responses, and may be a part of the mechanism of action of the widely-prescribed anti-diabetis drug metformin.

References

Further reading

External links